Renninger is a surname. Notable people with the surname include:

George Renninger, inventor of candy corn
John Renninger (1924–2005), American politician
Louis Renninger (1841–1908), American soldier
Mauritius Renninger (1905–1987), German theoretical physicist
Renninger negative-result experiment